Duwayne Robert Dunham (born November 17, 1952) is an American director and editor of film and television, as well as an adjunct professor at the USC School of Cinematic Arts. He is best known for his collaborations with George Lucas and David Lynch, serving as editor on Return of the Jedi and Blue Velvet. After being hired for Lynch's series Twin Peaks, he was promoted to director and made his debut with the second episode of the series. He subsequently directed the films Homeward Bound: The Incredible Journey and Little Giants, and numerous television films for the Disney Channel including Halloweentown, The Thirteenth Year, Ready to Run, Right on Track, and Tiger Cruise.

In 2018, he reunited with Lynch to edit all 18 episodes of the Twin Peaks: The Return revival series. During the 1978 San Anselmo Country Fair in San Anselmo, CA, Dunham became the first person to portray Star Wars bounty hunter Boba Fett, the character's public debut.

For his work on Twin Peaks, Dunham won a Primetime Emmy Award in 1990.

Filmography

Film

Television

References

External links

American film directors
American film editors
American television directors
Living people
Place of birth missing (living people)
1952 births